Capanna is an Italian surname. Notable people with the surname include:

Mario Capanna (born 1945), Italian politician and writer
Puccio Capanna, 14th-century Italian painter 

Italian-language surnames